Katerina Harvati (born 1970 in Athens) is a Greek paleoanthropologist and expert in early human evolution. She specializes in the broad application of 3-D geometric morphometric and virtual anthropology methods to paleoanthropology. Since 2009, she has been full professor and director of Paleoanthropology at the University of Tübingen, Germany.

Life
Harvati is a graduate of Columbia University, New York, where she earned a B.A. in Anthropology 1994 (summa cum laude). Four years later, she received her master’s degree in Anthropology at Hunter College, City University of New York. After having been awarded with her Ph.D. at CUNY in 2001 she worked as an assistant professor at New York University. From 2004 to 2009, she was senior researcher at the Max Planck Institute for Evolutionary Anthropology in Leipzig, Germany. In 2005, she became also adjunct associate professor at the City University of New York Graduate School and in 2009 she was appointed full professor at the University of Tübingen and director of Paleoanthropology. In 2010, she was elected fellow of the American Association for the Advancement of Science for her contributions to Paleoanthropology. Harvati is married to the Greek biotechnology executive Elias Papatheodorou. They have two children.

Research
Harvati´s research focuses on primate and human evolution as well as on evolutionary theory, with emphasis on the paleobiology of Pleistocene humans and modern human origins. She has conducted fieldwork in different parts of Europe and Africa and contributed largely to the understanding of the relationship of morphological variability to population history and the environment. Harvati has led recent breakthroughs in the understanding of modern human origins and Neanderthal behavior. Her recent work on the fossil human remains from Apidima Cave, Southern Greece, pushed back the arrival of Homo sapiens in Europe by more than 150 thousand years, showing an earlier and much more geographically widespread early modern human dispersal than was previously known (Harvati et al. 2019 Nature). This work was listed as one of the most important discoveries of the year by The Guardian, Discover Magazine and LiveScience, as well as one of the most important archaeological discoveries of the decade by Gizmodo. She led research overthrowing long held assumptions about increased levels of violence and traumatic injuries relative to modern humans (Beier et al. 2018) and demonstrating that Neanderthals regularly performed precise manipulative activities, contrary to previous beliefs (Karakostis et al. 2018). Other contributions include the assessment of the Neanderthal species status (Harvati et al. 2004 PNAS), the identification of an early modern human in Southern Africa (Grine et al. 2007 Science; a publication that TIME magazine ranked as one out of Top Ten discoveries of the year); and the demonstration that modern humans evolved much earlier than previously thought, around 300,000 years ago in Morocco (Hublin et al. 2017, Nature). Finally, Harvati's work has spearheaded paleolithic and paleoanthropological research in South-East Europe (Harvati and Roskandic 2016, Tourloukis and Harvati 2018). She has received two grants of the European Research Council, one ERC Starting Grant in 2011, and one ERC Consolidator Grant in 2016. In addition, she directs a Centre for Advanced Studies on linguistic, cultural and biological trajectories of the human past since 2015.

Awards
 1997 Alexander S. Onassis Public Benefit Foundation Doctoral Fellowship
 1998 American Museum of Natural History Fellowship (Anthropology and Paleontology) 
 2000 City University of New York Dissertation Year Fellowship
 2009 Hellenes abroad award – Woman of the year 2009, Europe
 2011 ERC Starting Grant
 2014 Research Prize of Baden-Württemberg for basic research
 2016 ERC Consolidator Grant
 2021 Leibniz Prize of the German Research Foundation (DFG)

Publications

References

External links

Columbia College (New York) alumni
City University of New York alumni
Academic staff of the University of Tübingen
Greek paleoanthropologists
Living people
1970 births
People from Athens